Rafael Matos and David Vega Hernández defeated Fabian Fallert and Oscar Otte in the final, 3–6, 7–5, [10–8] to win the doubles tennis title at the 2022 Sofia Open.

Jonny O'Mara and Ken Skupski were the reigning champions, but did not participate this year.

Seeds

Draw

Draw

References

External links
 Main draw

Sofia Open
Sofia Open